Ononis reclinata is a species of annual herb in the family Fabaceae. They have a self-supporting growth form and compound, broad leaves. Individuals can grow to 6.4 cm.

Sources

References 

reclinata